North Adams is a city in Berkshire County, Massachusetts, United States. It is part of the Pittsfield, Massachusetts Metropolitan Statistical Area. Its population was 12,961 as of the 2020 census. Best known as the home of the largest contemporary art museum in the United States, the Massachusetts Museum of Contemporary Art, North Adams has in recent years become a center for tourism, culture and recreation.

History

Early history

North Adams was first settled in 1745 during King George's War, when the most western of a line of defensive forts was built along the bank of the Hoosic River, and occupied by British soldiers and their families. During the war, Canadian and Native American forces laid siege to Fort Massachusetts 30 prisoners were taken to Quebec; half died in captivity. In 1747 Fort Massachusetts was rebuilt with improved defenses, but was never attacked again. In a period of peace following the Treaty of Aix-la-Chapelle, many of the soldiers who had been garrisoned at the fort turned to farming instead by opting to each take a 190-acre package of nearby land in lieu of back-pay in the nearby township of West Hoosac (now known as Williamstown).

The North Adams Women's Club began raising funds in 1895 to reconstruct the fort as a memorial site. It was dedicated in 1933 and operated as a historical tourist site until the 1960s. The 1933 Fort's replica chimney is located at the rear of the Central Markets Supermarket that opened at the site in 1960 and closed in 2016 as a Price Chopper Supermarket. The historic site was conveyed to the City of North Adams by the Golub family in 2017.

The town was incorporated separately from Adams in 1878, and reincorporated as a city in 1895. The city is named in honor of Samuel Adams, a leader in the American Revolution, signer of the Declaration of Independence, and governor of Massachusetts.

For much of its history, North Adams was a mill town. Manufacturing began in the city before the Revolutionary War, largely because the confluence of the Hoosic River's two branches provided water power for small-scale industry. By the late 1700s and early 1800s, businesses included wholesale shoe manufacturers; a brick yard; a saw mill; cabinet-makers; hat manufacturers; machine shops for the construction of mill machines; marble works; wagon and sleigh-makers; and an ironworks, which provided the pig iron for armor plates on the Civil War ship, the Monitor.

Expansion westwards started with the creation of three mill villages, Blackinton in 1821, Greylock in 
1846 and Braytonville in 1832, located to take advantage of the Hoosac River's water power.  The 1850 census marked the official shift of the town from agriculture to industry, since more factory workers than farmers now resided in the town.  In 1870 the use of Chinese strikebreakers from California to break the North Adams strike at the Sampson Shoe Factory (today part of the Mass MoCA complex) was an important step in the movement of Chinese from the west coast to the east coast, resulting in east coast Chinatowns in the United States. On a national scale, the North Adams strike became known as the primary trigger to the passage of the Chinese Exclusion Act by the U.S. Congress in 1882.

North Adams was also the headquarters for building the Hoosac Tunnel starting in 1851 and completed in 1874, adding an east–west connection to Boston and Albany to the existing 1842 rail connection to New York.  Prior to that time, inter-regional travel was limited to weekly stagecoaches from Albany and Greenfield.

Downtown in 1860, Oliver Arnold and Company was established with the latest equipment for printing cloth. Large government contracts to supply fabric for the Union Army helped the business prosper. During the next four decades, Arnold Print Works became one of the world's leading manufacturers of printed textiles. It also became the largest employer in North Adams, with some 3,200 workers by 1905. Despite decades of success, falling cloth prices and the lingering effects of the Great Depression forced the company to close its Marshall Street operation in 1942 and consolidate at smaller facilities in Adams.

Sprague Electric

Later that year, the Sprague Electric Company bought the former print works site. Sprague physicists, chemists, electrical engineers, and skilled technicians were called upon by the U.S. government during World War II to design and manufacture crucial components of advanced weapons systems, including the atomic bomb.

With state-of-the-art equipment, Sprague was a major research and development center, conducting studies on electricity and semi-conducting materials. After the war, its products were used in the launch systems for Gemini moon missions, and by 1966 Sprague employed 4,137 workers in a community of 18,000. From the post-war years to the mid-1980s, Sprague produced electrical components for the booming consumer electronics market, but competition from abroad led to declining sales and, in 1985, the company closed operations on Marshall Street. Its closure devastated the local economy. Unemployment rates rose and population declined.

MASS MoCA

After Sprague closed, business and political leaders in North Adams sought ways to re-use the vast complex. Williams College Museum of Art director Thomas Krens, who would later become Director of the Guggenheim, was looking for space to exhibit large works of contemporary art that would not fit in conventional museum galleries. When mayor John Barrett III (serving 1984–2009) suggested the vast Marshall Street complex as a possible exhibition site, the idea of creating a contemporary arts center in North Adams began to take shape.

The campaign to build support for the proposed institution, which would serve as a platform for presenting contemporary art and developing links to the region's other cultural institutions, began in earnest. The Massachusetts legislature announced its support for the project in 1988. Subsequent economic upheaval threatened the project, but broad-based support from the community and the private sector, which pledged more than $8 million, ensured that it moved forward. The eventual proposal used the scale and versatility of the industrial spaces to link the facility's past and its new life as the country's largest center for contemporary visual and performing arts.

Since it opened, the Massachusetts Museum of Contemporary Art (MASS MoCA) has been part of a larger economic transformation in the region based on cultural, recreational, and educational offerings. North Adams has become home for several new restaurants, contemporary art galleries, and cultural organizations. In addition, once-shuttered area factories and mills have been rehabilitated as lofts for artists to live and work in.

Geography

North Adams is bordered by Clarksburg to the north, Florida to the east, Adams to the south, and Williamstown to the west.

North Adams is located in the valley created by the Hoosic River, which has been walled and floored with concrete in portions to prevent floods. The city's Natural Bridge State Park contains the only natural white marble bridge in North America. Formed by glacial melt by 11,000 BCE, the arch and abandoned quarry have long attracted attention from hikers, including Nathaniel Hawthorne in 1838, who wrote of it (among other local features) in his An American Notebook. To the east, the city is bordered by the western face of the Hoosac Range, with visibility on its West Summit extending throughout the tri-state area. The Appalachian Trail passes through the western part of the city, crossing the summit of Mount Williams and briefly passing through Williamstown before heading north towards Vermont.

Climate

North Adams has a humid continental climate (Dfb). Summers are warm and pleasant, with temperatures at or above  four times per year. On average, 153 days see measurable precipitation per year.

Transportation

Roads and highways
North Adams is the western terminus of the Mohawk Trail, which ascends to the West Summit along a steep, curving road. While the trail ends here, Massachusetts Route 2, which the trail is coextensive with, continues westward into Williamstown and towards New York. Route 8 also passes through the city, passing from Adams through the city and northward into Clarksburg. Route 8A, also known as 8A-U (for "upper"), runs parallel to Route 8 east of the main route, and is located entirely within city limits.

The nearest interstate highway is Interstate 91 to the east, almost an hour away. North Adams appears on that highway's signs at Exit 26, located in Greenfield.

Public transportation
The city is the northern terminus of several lines of the Berkshire Regional Transit Authority (BRTA) and also has regional service. Intercity bus service is provided in nearby Williamstown by Peter Pan Lines with connections to New York City, as well as towns and cities between. North Adams is home to Harriman-and-West Airport, a small regional airport. The nearest airport with national service is Albany International Airport. The freight rail line which passes through the city extends through the Hoosac Tunnel towards the east. The nearest passenger rail service to North Adams is the recently re-routed Amtrak Vermonter in Greenfield, Massachusetts, an hour to the east. Pittsfield, to the south, also has once-daily Amtrak service, the Lake Shore Limited, at its station. There is a proposal known as "Northern Tier Passenger Rail" in the early stages of planning which would extend MBTA's Fitchburg Line westward through Greenfield and terminate at North Adams. This would be the first passenger rail in the town since service ended in the 1950s.

Demographics

As of the census of 2010, there were 13,708 people, 5,652 households, and 3,156 families residing in the city. The city, which is the smallest in Massachusetts, ranks second (after Pittsfield) out of 32 cities and towns in Berkshire County by population. The racial makeup of the city was 93.0% White, 1.8% African American, 0.4% Native American, 1.1% Asian, 0.2% Pacific Islander, 0.8% from other races, and 2.8% from two or more races. Hispanic or Latino of any race were 2.4% of the population.

There were 5,652 households, out of which 23.6% had children under the age of 18 living with them, 38.4% were married couples living together, 12.5% had a female householder with no husband present, and 44.2% were non-families. 39.7% of all households were made up of individuals, and 15.0% had someone living alone who was 65 years of age or older. The average household size was 2.21 and the average family size was 2.98.

In the city, the population was spread out, with 21.74% under the age of 18, 16.9% from 18 to 24, 21.4% from 25 to 44, 23.7% from 45 to 64, and 16.4% who were 65 years of age or older. The median age was 38 years. For every 100 females, there were 91.2 males. For every 100 females age 18 and over, there were 89.75 males.

The median income for a household in the city was $35,020, and the median income for a family was $90,000. The per capita income for the city was $19,857. About 9.0% of families and 22.3% of the population were below the poverty line, including 11.0% of those age 20 or over.

Government

North Adams is governed by the mayor-council form of government (list of mayors of North Adams, Massachusetts). The city has its own services, including police, fire and public works. The city's public library is the largest in northern Berkshire County and has access to the regional library networks.

On the state level, North Adams is represented in the Massachusetts House of Representatives by the First Berkshire district, which covers northern Berkshire County, and is represented by former mayor John Barrett III of North Adams (elected in a special election in November, 2017). In the Massachusetts Senate, the city is represented Sen. Adam Hinds (the Berkshire, Hampshire and Franklin district, which includes all of Berkshire County and western Hampshire and Franklin counties). The city is patrolled by the Fourth (Cheshire) Station of Barracks "B" of the Massachusetts State Police.

On the national level, North Adams is represented in the United States House of Representatives as part of Massachusetts's 1st congressional district, and is represented by Richard Neal of Springfield. Massachusetts is currently represented in the United States Senate by senior Senator Elizabeth Warren and junior Senator Ed Markey.

Crime

In December 2018 it was discovered that nearly one-third of aggravated assaults in the city have been incorrectly included in federal data, artificially inflating the reported violent crime rate in North Adams. It is unclear for how long the error has impacted the city's crime reports. As of August 2020 the city was unable to have the record corrected in the FBI's official statistics.

Education

North Adams operates its own public school system, with three elementary schools (Brayton Elementary School, Greylock Elementary School and Colegrove Park Elementary School) and Drury High School, which also serves several neighboring towns. The city is also home to Charles H. McCann Technical High School, as well as several private and parochial schools.

Former schools

Johnson School (Closed 1994, Grades Pre-K–5)
Silvio O. Conte Middle School (Closed June 2009, Grades 6–8)
Sullivan Elementary School (Closed December 2015, Grades K–7) 
St. Joseph's School (North Adams, Massachusetts) (Closed in 1970s)
Notre Dame school. Closed 1975. Grades K–8.

Higher education

Massachusetts College of Liberal Arts (MCLA) enrolls about 1,980 students. The most popular programs are English/Communications, Business, Education, History, Fine & Performing Arts, Psychology, and Sociology. Founded in 1894 as North Adams Normal School, in 1932 the Normal School became the State Teachers College of North Adams. In 1960, the college changed its name to North Adams State College and added professional degrees in Business Administration and Education. In 1997, the name changed to Massachusetts College of Liberal Arts, reflective of specialty school status within the Massachusetts State College system. In recent years, MCLA has begun to develop more academic programming in the fields of fine arts and arts management, reflecting the region's growth as a center of arts and cultural affairs.

Beyond MCLA, the nearest state university is the University of Massachusetts Amherst. The nearest private college is Williams College, in neighboring Williamstown.

Culture

Arts
Due to North Adams being the location of MASS MoCA, there are numerous art galleries spread throughout the city, and a few of the old mills have been converted to lofts for artists to live and work in.  A new, Frank Gehry-designed Extreme Model Railroad and Contemporary Architecture Museum is proposed to be built in North Adams.

Literature
Several books have been written about the City of North Adams, including "Steeples: Sketches of North Adams" by Joe Manning, a blend of poetry, oral histories, and photographs. Steeples details how the face of America has been changed by the urban renewal projects of the 1960s and 1970s, the decline of the industrial revolution, and the flight to the suburbs and the shopping malls.

Sports

The city is home to the North Adams SteepleCats of the New England Collegiate Baseball League (NECBL). The SteepleCats play at Joe Wolfe Field in North Adams. The SteepleCats hold the NECBL record for highest single-game attendance. The record was made on July 4, 2006, in a game against the Holyoke Giants in front of 6,714 fans. Holyoke won the game 3–2.

North Adams' first professional sports franchise was the Berkshire Battalion, an expansion team of the Federal Hockey League, which played a single season in 2014–2015.  Troubled by an embezzlement charge against its coach and general manager, who had also been manager of the municipal skating ring, and fractious lease negotiations with the city, the team relocated after its single season to Dayton, Ohio.

There are many athletic complexes and recreational fields throughout the city, including the Noel Field Athletic Complex, just south of the downtown, and the recently constructed Alcombright Athletic Complex, in the city's west end.

Sites and events of interest

 Houghton Mansion
 Massachusetts College of Liberal Arts
 Massachusetts Museum of Contemporary Art
 Natural Bridge State Park
 North Adams Museum of History and Science—North Adams Historical Society
 Western Gateway Heritage State Park

Events
 Fall Foliage Festival
 Solid Sound Festival

National Register of Historic Places

 Armstrong House
 Beaver Mill
 Blackinton Historic District
 The Boardman
 Charles Browne House
 Church Street-Caddy Hill Historic District
 H. W. Clark Biscuit Company
 Crowley House
 Freeman's Grove Historic District
 Freight Yard Historic District
 Hathaway Tenement
 Hillside Cemetery
 Hoosac Tunnel
 Johnson Manufacturing Company
 Johnson School
 Monument Square-Eagle Street Historic District
 Norad Mill
 Wells House
 Windsor Print Works

Notable people

 Amanda L. Aikens (1833–1892), Editor, philanthropist
 Caleb Atwater (1778–1867), Archeologist, politician
 Paul Babeau (born 1969), Sheriff, politician
 Andrea Barrett (born 1954), Novelist
 Jonah Bayliss (born 1980), MLB relief pitcher
 Daniel E. Bosley (born 1953), State representative
 Harry C. Browne (1878–1954), Banjo player and actor
 Gailanne Cariddi (1953–2017), State representatives
 Arthur P. Carpenter, US Marshal for Vermont
 Jack Chesbro (1874–1931), Hall of Fame pitcher
 Martha Coakley (born 1953), Massachusetts attorney general
 Jeremiah Colegrove (1758–1836), Early leading citizen
 John M. Darby (1804–1877), Botanist, chemist
 Will Durant (1885–1981), Philosopher, historian
 Paul Farmer (1959–2022), Physician, anthropologist
 Joseph F. Finnegan (1904–1964), Labor mediator
 Van Hansis (born 1981), Actor
 John Henry Haynes (1849–1910), Archaeologist and photographer
 Peter Laird (born 1954), Comic book artist
 Amy Lee, Saxophonist
 Frank J. Matrango (1926–1996), Massachusetts state legislator
 Allan Rockwell McCann (1896–1978), Vice admiral, USN
 Martin Melcher (1915–1968), Film producer and husband of Doris Day
 Francis Millard  (1914–1958), U.S. Olympic Silver Medalist Wrestler
 Thomas Ward Osborn (1833–1898), U.S. Senator, Col. in Civil War
 Harrison Potter (1891–1984), Classical pianist
 Fritz Redl (1902-1988), Child psychoanalyst and educator
 Robert Rheinlander (1880–1961), Architect and civil engineer
 John Henry Schwarz, Theoretical physicist
 Hiram Sibley (1807–1888), Industrialist, philanthropist
 Frank J. Sprague (1857–1934), Electrical engineer, inventor
 John St. Cyr (1936–2022), Massachusetts state legislator and judge
 Jane Swift (born 1965), Massachusetts Lt. governor
 Oswald Tower (1883–1968), Basketball official
 Frank Vincent (1939–2017), Actor
 Ashley B. Wright (1841–1897), U.S. representative

Sister City
  Tremosine sul Garda, Italy

See also
 List of mill towns in Massachusetts

References
Notes

Sources
 History of Monument Square
 History of North Adams, Massachusetts (1749-1885)
 History of North Adams Public Library
 History of Sprague Electric/MASS MoCA site

External links

 City of North Adams official website
 North Adams Historical Society
 Northern Berkshire Chamber of Commerce
 Articles about North Adams and photos of the city by author and historian Joe Manning

 
Populated places established in 1745
Cities in Massachusetts
Cities in Berkshire County, Massachusetts
1745 establishments in Massachusetts